Corestăuți is a commune in Ocnița District, Moldova. It is composed of two villages, Corestăuți and Stălinești (depopulated as of 2014).

Notable people
 Alexandru Moraru

References

Communes of Ocnița District